Beyond Belief may refer to:

Books 
 Beyond Belief: A Buddhist Critique of Fundamentalist Christianity (1994) by A. L. De Silva
 Beyond Belief: A Chronicle of Murder and Its Detection, a 1967 book by Emlyn Williams
 Beyond Belief: The American Press And The Coming Of The Holocaust, 1933–1945 (1993) by Deborah Lipstadt
 Beyond Belief: Islamic Excursions among the Converted Peoples, a 1998 book by V. S. Naipaul
 Beyond Belief: The Secret Gospel of Thomas by Elaine Pagels, first published in 2004
 Beyond Belief: My Secret Life Inside Scientology and My Harrowing Escape (2013) by Jenna Miscavige Hill

Film, television and radio 
 Beyond Belief with George Noory, an online TV series launched in 2013 exploring paranormal and related subjects
 Beyond Belief (Stage Show/Podcast), a segment of the Thrilling Adventure Hour, a monthly stage show and podcast done in the style of old time radio
 Beyond Belief (1990 film), a short film featuring the band Petra
 Beyond Belief (2007 film), a documentary about two 9/11 widows
 Beyond Belief: Fact or Fiction, an American TV anthology series
 Beyond Belief (radio series), a BBC series featuring the discussion of religious issues

Music 
 Beyond Belief (album), a 1990 album by Petra
 Beyond Belief, an album by Mark McGuire (musician)
 "Beyond Belief", a 1982 song by Elvis Costello

Other uses 
 Beyond Belief (symposium), a series of conferences sponsored by the Science Network
 Beyond Belief: Science, Religion, Reason and Survival, the first symposium, in 2006